The Early Years or Early Years may refer to:

Education
Early Years Foundation Stage, UK education structure
Early Years Professional Status, UK educational qualification

Film, television and video games
Dallas: The Early Years, a 1986 made-for-television film
The Early Years Live, a video album of live performances by the Dead Kennedys
Doctor Who at the BBC Radiophonic Workshop Volume 1: The Early Years 1963–1969, a compilation of Doctor Who material
Evolution/Revolution: The Early Years (1966–1974), a stand-up comedy recording by Richard Prior
King of Kings: The Early Years, a video game
The Early Years (film) (aka La giovinezza), a 2015 Italian film

Music
The Early Years (band), an English rock band

Albums
The Early Years (Acid King album)
The Early Years (D-A-D album)
The Early Years (Dannii Minogue album)
The Early Years (David Coverdale album)
The Early Years (Deep Purple album)
The Early Years (Donovan album)
The Early Years (Eluveitie album)
The Early Years (Gasolin' album)
The Early Years (Hall & Oates album)
The Early Years (Helix album)
The Early Years (Joe Nichols album)
The Early Years (Phil Ochs album)
The Early Years (The Starting Line album)
The Early Years (Violeta de Outono album)
The Early Years (Whitesnake album)
The Early Years (ZOEgirl album)
The Early Years (album series), by Tom Waits
The Early Years 1946–1957, by Chet Atkins
The Early Years 1964–1965, by the Monks
The Early Years 1965–1972, by Pink Floyd
The Early Years 79–81, by Def Leppard
The Early Years: 1990–1995, by the Casualties
The Early Years (1996–2001), by Skillet
The Early Years: 1997–2000, by Switchfoot
The Early Years: Rare Demos '91–'94, by Ill Bill
The Early Years – Revisited, by Zebrahead
Early Years, Vol. 1, by Hank Williams Jr.
Early Years, Vol. 2, by Hank Williams Jr.
18 Candles: The Early Years, by Silverstein
Flying: The Early Years 1970 – 1973, an album by UFO
Galloping Guitar: The Early Years, by Chet Atkins
Portrait of Jaco: The Early Years, 1968–1978, by Jaco Pastorius
Unchained Melody: The Early Years, by LeAnn Rimes
The Early Years, by Aretha Franklin
The Early Years, by Dropkick Murphys
The Early Years, by Fra Lippo Lippi
The Early Years, by Gravity Noir
The Early Years, by Harem Scarem
The Early Years, by Moev
The Early Years, by Out of the Grey
The Early Years, by Rebecca St. James
The Early Years, by Rudy + Blitz
The Early Years, by Sara Evans
The Early Years, by Sonicflood
The Early Years EP, by the Rocket Summer
The Early Years 1977–1978, by Simple Minds
The Early Years: 1988–1991, by Anal Cunt
The Early Years '74 '75 '76 Rare Live and Unreleased, by the Stranglers
Early Years, by Waltari
The Very Best of Donovan: The Early Years, by Donovan

See also
Best of the Early Years (disambiguation)